Norway High School can refer to:
Norway High School (Iowa)
Norway High School (Michigan)